The moustache jawfish (Opistognathus lonchurus) is a species of jawfish native to the western Atlantic Ocean where it occurs in the Gulf of Mexico and the Caribbean Sea.  It is a reef inhabitant.  This species can reach a length of  TL.  It can also be found in the aquarium trade.

References

Moustache jawfish
Taxa named by David Starr Jordan
Taxa named by Charles Henry Gilbert
Fish described in 1882